USS Atchison County (LST-60) was an  built for the United States Navy during World War II. Named for counties in Kansas and Missouri established in honor of David Rice Atchison, a mid-19th century Democratic United States Senator from Missouri, she was the only U.S. Naval vessel to bear the name.

LST-60 was laid down on 14 November 1943 at Neville Island, Pittsburgh, Pennsylvania, by the Dravo Corporation; launched on 24 December; sponsored by Mrs. Daniel W. Mack; and placed in reduced commission on 24 January 1944 so that she might descend the Ohio and Mississippi Rivers under her own power to New Orleans where she was placed in full commission on 7 February.

Service history
The new tank landing ship held shakedown training off Panama City, Florida, from 19 February to 4 March; then returned to New Orleans for repairs and loading. She next moved to New York City, where she took additional cargo on board for transportation to the United Kingdom. After crossing the Atlantic in convoy, LST-60 safely arrived in Falmouth, United Kingdom, on 2 May. From there, she proceeded to Southend-on-Sea to load for the Normandy invasion. LST-60 sailed from Southend on 5 June with Commander, Group 3, embarked for the initial assault. Following successful unloading of troops and cargo at Normandy the next day, the ship commenced cross-channel operations, making 53 trips to the French mainland without mishap before being ordered back to the United States for overhaul. Escorting a convoy en route, LST-60 safely arrived in Norfolk, Virginia on 1 July 1945 and continued on to New Orleans for repairs.
 
Originally scheduled to join the Pacific Fleet following overhaul, LST-60 received new orders with the end of the war on 15 August. Instead, she proceeded to Green Cove Springs, Florida for inactivation and was placed out of commission, in reserve, on 27 June 1946. The name USS Atchison County was assigned to LST-60 on 1 July 1955. In 1958, the tank landing ship was declared unfit for further naval service. Her name was struck from the Naval Vessel Register on 1 November 1958.

She was sold for commercial use and renamed Elmar in 1962 being scrapped in August 1973.
 
LST-60 earned one battle star for World War II service.

References

 
 

 

World War II amphibious warfare vessels of the United States
Ships built in Pittsburgh
1943 ships
LST-1-class tank landing ships of the United States Navy
Ships built by Dravo Corporation